Stanley Andrisse is an American endocrinologist scientist and writer who is an assistant professor at the Howard University College of Medicine. His research considers Type 2 diabetes and the pathways of insulin resistant states. He is the author of From Prison Cells to PhD: It is Never Too Late to Do Good, and director of an outreach program that supports formerly incarcerated people into college education.

Early life and education 
Andrisse grew up in Missouri. He was part of the Ferguson-Florissant School District. Andrisse has said that he made poor decisions as a young person, and he was first arrested at the age of 14. By his early twenties he had been sentenced to ten years in maximum security penitentiary. During his time in prison he was part of a drug rehabilitation program.

Andrisse was an undergraduate student at Lindenwood University. He remained at Lindenwood for graduate studies, where he worked toward an Master of Business Administration. While there, he played NCAA Division III Football Championship. He was accepted to a doctoral program at Saint Louis University, and completed his PhD in 2014. After earning his doctorate he was appointed a postdoctoral fellow at Johns Hopkins University.

Research and career 
Andrisse is an endocrinologist at Howard University College of Medicine, where he studies type 2 diabetes and insulin resistance.

In 2017, Andrisse was named JustLeadership's Leading with Conviction Fellow. In this capacity, he works to reduce the prison population by 50% by 2030. Andrisse's first book, From Prison Cells to PhD: It is Never Too Late to Do Good, was published by Simon & Schuster in 2021. He established a nonprofit program to provide mentoring to current and former incarcerated people so that they can start building their careers after leaving prison.

Selected publications

References 

Living people
Year of birth missing (living people)
American endocrinologists
Lindenwood University alumni
Lindenwood Lions football players
Saint Louis University alumni
Howard University faculty
People from St. Louis County, Missouri
African-American scientists
African-American physicians
21st-century African-American people